Mayweather Promotions, LLC is a boxing promotional firm founded in 2007 by Floyd Mayweather Jr., after exercising a provision in his contract with Bob Arum and Top Rank that allowed him to become a free agent for the price of $750,000. Al Haymon has been an advisor of Mayweather since then. Mayweather Promotions also promotes forms of live entertainment, including sporting events, live musical and theatrical events, and film and television productions. Mayweather Promotions mainly co-promotes with Golden Boy Promotions. Leonard Ellerbe is the current CEO.

Current boxers

Former boxers

Trainers 
Floyd Mayweather Sr.
Cornelius Boza-Edwards
Jeff Mayweather
Dewey Cooper

Former trainers 
Roger Mayweather

See also
Golden Boy Promotions

References

External links
Mayweather Promotions

Boxing promoters
Sports event promotion companies
Companies based in Paradise, Nevada
Entertainment companies established in 2007
2007 establishments in Nevada